The 1914 Colorado gubernatorial election was held on November 3, 1914. Republican nominee George Alfred Carlson defeated Democratic nominee Thomas M. Patterson with 48.67% of the vote.

Primary elections
Primary elections were held on September 8, 1914.

Democratic primary

Candidates
Thomas M. Patterson, former United States Senator
Barnette T. Napier

Results

Republican primary

Candidates
George Alfred Carlson, Fort Collins District Attorney
Samuel D. Nicholson, former Mayor of Leadville
Frank C. Goudy, Denver District Attorney

Results

General election

Candidates
Major party candidates
George Alfred Carlson, Republican
Thomas M. Patterson, Democratic

Other candidates
Edward P. Costigan, Progressive
Abraham Marions, Socialist
L. D. Hosman, Socialist Labor

Results

References

1914
Colorado
Gubernatorial